The women's normal hill individual ski jumping competition for the 2014 Winter Olympics in Sochi, Russia, was held on 11 February 2014 at RusSki Gorki Jumping Center in the Esto-Sadok village on the northern slope of Aibga Ridge in Krasnaya Polyana. Women competed in ski jumping for the first time in the history of the Winter Olympic Games.

Results
The final was started at 22:25.

References

Ski jumping at the 2014 Winter Olympics
Women's events at the 2014 Winter Olympics
Ski